The Grosse Europa-Meile is a Group 3 flat horse race in Germany open to thoroughbreds aged three years or older. It is run over a distance of 1,600 metres (about 1 mile) at Munich in September.

History
The event was originally staged at Cologne as the Grosser Kaufhof-Preis. It was established in 1951, and the early runnings varied between 1,800 and 2,200 metres.

The race was shortened to a mile in 1972, and from this point it held Group 3 status. It was renamed the Elite-Preis in 1983, and promoted to Group 2 level in 1989. It reverted to its original title in 1991.

Europcar started a three-year period of sponsorship in 1998, and the event became known as the Grosse Europcar-Meile. It was later titled the Grosse Europa-Meile.

The Grosse Europa-Meile was transferred to Munich in 2011. It was relegated back to Group 3 level in 2013.

Records
Most successful horse (2 wins):
 Thiggo – 1962, 1963
 Spielhahn – 1966, 1967
 Lirung – 1985, 1986
 Alkalde – 1988, 1989
 Power Flame – 1997, 1998

Leading jockey (5 wins):
 Fritz Drechsler – Fuchstanz (1951), Magus (1955), Augustus (1956), Olivetto (1959), Arcaro (1971)
 Johannes Starosta – Harmodius (1953), Thiggo (1962, 1963), Spielhahn (1966, 1967)

Leading trainer (4 wins):
 Heinz Jentzsch – Arcaro (1971), Esclavo (1980), Lirung (1985, 1986)

Winners since 1972

Earlier winners

 1951: Fuchstanz
 1952: no race
 1953: Harmodius
 1954: Nizam
 1955: Magus
 1956: Augustus
 1957: Feuerball
 1958: Opernsänger
 1959: Olivetto
 1960: Kaiseradler
 1961: Aspiration
 1962: Thiggo
 1963: Thiggo
 1964: Lucius
 1965: Sissu
 1966: Spielhahn
 1967: Spielhahn
 1968: Lohengrin
 1969: Delabarre
 1970: Bernod
 1971: Arcaro

See also
 List of German flat horse races
 Recurring sporting events established in 1951 – this race is included under its original title, Grosser Kaufhof-Preis.

References

 Racing Post:

 galopp-sieger.de – Grosse Europa-Meile.
 horseracingintfed.com – International Federation of Horseracing Authorities – Grosse Europa-Meile (2012).
 pedigreequery.com – Grosse Europa-Meile.

Open mile category horse races
Sports competitions in Munich
Horse races in Germany